A House, A Home is a 2012 American short film/narrative music video scored by Alialujah Choir and features Portland Cello Project. Based on the song of the same name by Adam Shearer and Adam Selzer, the film adaptation was directed by Daniel Fickle, produced by Mark Smith, and written by Daniel Fickle and Mark Smith. Starring Meredith Adelaide and Calvin Morie McCarthy the film begins at the last lines of the song "A House, A Home": "You die knowing he'll bury you / Next to your love in the ground..." and tells a story of how a love, a death and another death are reconciled in a subterranean world.

In addition to being an official selection at the Raindance, Fantastic Fest and Mill Valley film festivals, A House, A Home was nominated for numerous awards ultimately winning thirty-two accolades including Best Short Film at the 32nd New Jersey Film Festival and Best of Festival at the 55th Rochester International Film Festival.  A House, A Home was selected as an Official Honoree in The 17th Annual Webby Awards in the Music category.

Synopsis 
Under the care of  Dr. James C. Hawthorne, fictional characters Partrick Brennan (1896-1914) and Sophia Mendenhall (1898-1921) share their temporal lives attracted to each other but are unable to a foster a relationship because of the confines of Dr. Hawthorne's mental institution. Patrick becomes convinced that Dr. Hawthorne is romantically involved with Sophia, a false reality that leaves him distraught and prompts him to take his life.

18-year-old Patrick (Calvin Morie McCarthy) lives an after-life in a small room continuously sketching the same object and exploring a tunnel system behind one of the walls.  Seven years have passed since he was buried by his guardian Dr. Hawthorne. The year is 1921, and the arrival of a neighbor is a redemptive blessing for Patrick.

Patrick peers through a keyhole and sees Sophia (Meredith Adelaide), now five years his senior. Discovering a passageway he crawls through a narrow tunnel and arrives at her door. Their reunion is awkward for Patrick. Their roles have been reversed, her life experiences eclipse his. The inhibitions of adolescence are in Sophia's past, but being far from the world they once inhabited the relative aspects of experience no longer matter.

Origin

In 2008, Kate Sokoloff produced a benefit album titled Dearly Departed. Sokoloff recruited singer-songwriters who had appeared on her OPB broadcast show Live Wire! Radio and asked each artist to write a song about a person buried at Portland's oldest cemetery. Along with Al James, Storm Large, Jesse Emerson, Matt Sheehy, Richie Young and others, Adam Shearer was asked to contribute to the 15-track compilation.

Shearer chose to write about Dr. James C. Hawthorne, a humanist and physician who founded the original Oregon State Hospital for the Insane. During the songwriting process, Shearer asked Adam Selzer of Norfolk & Western and M. Ward to collaborate on the arrangement. After completing "A House, A Home", Shearer and Selzer were inspired to continue writing and recording. They invited Alia Farah to join them and the band Alialujah Choir was formed.

In 2011, Shearer asked filmmaker Mark Smith to travel with his band Weinland to SXSW. On that trip Shearer shared the masters from Alialujah Choir's recording sessions. 
Smith became enamored with the song "A House, A Home". On his return to Portland, he decided to create a video that would begin at the last lines of the song: "You die knowing he'll bury you / Next to your love in the ground..." Smith contacted director Daniel Fickle and asked him to collaborate on the film.

Pre-production

To create an underground environment a series of sets were constructed from June 2011 to December 2011. The sets were constructed for the camera. Every wall and the ceilings of Sophia's and Patrick's rooms were removable. The floors were affixed with castor wheels allowing the rooms to rotate 360 degrees.

Filming

Principal photography took place in December 2011. Other than the reveal at the end of the film which was shot at Lone Fir Cemetery the production took place on a farm in Yamhill County, Oregon where the sets were built. The film was shot using a Sony FX 100 and Zeiss Compact Primes.

Awards

Nominations and Official Selections

Additional appearances

MTV Canada 
NME 
Current TV
First Post
IndieWire
VH1
Country Music Television

References

External links
 

2012 films
2010s musical films
American independent films
Films set in the 1920s
Films set in Oregon
2012 short films
American short films
2012 independent films
2010s English-language films
2010s American films